Tiétar may refer to:
Tiétar River, a river of Spain.
Tiétar, Cáceres, a municipality located in the province of Cáceres, Extremadura, Spain.
Tejeda de Tiétar, a municipality located in the province of Cáceres, Extremadura, Spain.
Santa María del Tiétar, a municipality located in the province of Ávila, Castile and León, Spain.